The Railway Companies Meetings Act 1869 (32 & 33 Vict. c. 6) was an Act of Parliament in the United Kingdom.

It repealed section 35 of the Regulation of Railways Act 1868, which related "to meetings of incorporated railway companies and the approval by such meetings of bills and certificates for conferring additional powers on those companies", with regard to any bill put before Parliament, or any application for a certificate made by a company, after 1 February 1869.

References
The practical statutes of the session 1869 (32 & 33 Victoria). William Paterson, 1869.

United Kingdom Acts of Parliament 1869
Railway Acts
1869 in rail transport